Ubartum was a female physician who lived in Garšana , a town in Mesopotamia around 2075 BC (in the Third Dynasty of Ur). Ubartum came from an influential family. Both brothers were physicians too and one of them was married to a daughter of king Shulgi. Ubartum is only known from about 50 cuneiform texts, eleven of them call her physician. The texts naming her are all of economical nature. They mostly just provide the information that Ubartum received goods. They cover 16 years.

References 

Third Dynasty of Ur
21st-century BC women
Ancient physicians